Secret and Explicit (Russian title: Тайное и Явное) is a Soviet anti-Semitic propaganda film, filmed in 1973 at the Central Studio for Documentary Film (Moscow). The film is known to reuse footage from Der Ewige Jude.

Plot 
The film starts by showing a demonstration in London at the Soviet embassy. The voice-over informs that "this petty Zionist agent ... recruited and paid 5 pounds to each of the demonstrators from the Zionist treasury." In reality the footage shows the 1972 demonstration against the conditions of detention in the Soviet prison of the pregnant Lyudmila Prussakova, the wife of Valentin Prussakov. The demonstration was triggered by the Bernard Levin's Times column, which reported on Prussakova's state, and was organized by British actresses Haley Mills and Barbara Oberman.

The film reflected the anti-Zionist point of view prevailing at that time in Soviet ideology. The film, in particular, accuses Zionism of cooperation with Nazi Germany, including the mass extermination of Jews (the Holocaust) and the indigenous peoples of the USSR. The Soviet version of the role of Zionism in the Middle East conflict is reflected. The film represents the activities of Zionist organizations as subversive, directed against the USSR and other countries. The film also reflects the opinion on the role of owners of transnational corporations in the policy of Zionism.

Criticism 
Broadcasting due to scandalous wording was banned. Oleg Platonov, referring to the filmmakers Karpov and Zhukov, writes that the film was banned by Yuri Andropov and KGB General Philip Bobkov. He writes that Karpov took out an abbreviated version of the film from the editing room, which was then shown at the apartments of "some high-ranking officials of the Russian leadership"   The World War II cameraman Leonid Kogan wrote in a letter addressed to Leonid Brezhnev that "the film uses material from the Nazi anti-Semitic films" and it forms the impression that "Zionism and Jews are one and the same." Kogan called the film Black Hundreds inspired and expressed surprise that such a work could appear within the framework of the Central Studio for Documentary Film studio.

Doctor of Art History Valery Fomin found out that the film was commissioned by the ideological department of the CPSU Central Committee in accordance with the recommendations on strengthening the ideological struggle against Zionism and was supervised in the process of creation. A famous film critic Miron Chernenko wrote that "the authors and consultants clearly broke a certain line, behind which state anti-Semitism came into conflict with the so-called "proletarian internationalism." Chernenko calls the film the top of the "rabid" anti-Zionist "but actually anti-Semitic propaganda" that unfolded in the USSR after the end of the Six-Day War.

Nikolai Mitrokhin, the candidate of historical sciences, regarded the film as "pseudo-documentary" and connects it with the conspiracy theory, according to which Jews are allegedly behind all key events of the 20th century.

References 

1973 films
Antisemitism in the Soviet Union
Anti-Zionism in the Soviet Union
Soviet documentary films
Antisemitic films
Antisemitic propaganda